Yannis Vladimirovich Mandzukas (born 8 April 1984) is a retired Uzbekistani-Greek professional footballer who last played for Qizilqum Zarafshon as a midfielder.

Career
Born in Chirchiq, Mandzukas began his football career with Uzbek second division side Kimyogar Chirchiq. He had a brief spell in the Belarusian Premier League with FC MTZ-RIPO Minsk, before joining to Uzbek League side FC Bunyodkor.

Career statistics

Club

International

Statistics accurate as of match played 27 March 2007

International goals

Honours 
Bunyodkor
 Uzbek League (2): 2010, 2011
 Uzbekistan Cup (1): 2010

References

External links
 
 
 

1984 births
Living people
Pontic Greeks
Uzbekistani people of Greek descent
Uzbekistani footballers
Association football midfielders
Uzbekistan international footballers
Uzbekistani expatriate footballers
Expatriate footballers in Belarus
Uzbekistani expatriate sportspeople in Belarus
FC Partizan Minsk players
FC Bunyodkor players
PFC Lokomotiv Tashkent players
FK Mash'al Mubarek players